Sir Thomas Alexander Fraser Noble  (29 April 1918 – 21 August 2003) was a Scottish academic. He was former Vice-Chancellor of the University of Leicester and then Principal of the University of Aberdeen.

Early life
He was born in Cromdale in Strathspey, Scotland. His father was Simon Noble of Grantown-on-Spey in the former Moray, and his mother was Jeanie Graham from Largs in North Ayrshire. His father died when he was eight. He had a brother. He attended Nairn Academy. He went to the University of Aberdeen when aged only 16. He graduated with a degree in Classics in 1938. He did military service with the Black Watch (Royal Highland Regiment).

Career

University of Leicester
In 1962 he became Vice-Chancellor of the University of Leicester at the age of 43. The University of Leicester now has the Fraser Noble Building. In 1962 the university had 1,500 students and two faculties of Arts and Sciences. By the time he left, the university had five faculties and 6,000 students. Thanks to him, the Royal Commission on Medical Education (1965–68) in its 1968 report decided that the university needed a medical school. From 1970-72 he was Chairman of the Committee of Vice-Chancellors and Principals of the Universities of the United Kingdom (now known as Universities UK).

University of Aberdeen
From 1948 to 1957 he lectured in Political Economy (Economics) at the University of Aberdeen. He drew up the constitution for the Scottish Economic Society. He became the Principal of the University of Aberdeen in 1976. The university, like Leicester, has a Fraser Noble Building.

Personal life
He was knighted in the 1971 Birthday Honours. He married in 1945 and they had a son and a daughter. His wife taught Maths at Nairn Academy. He enjoyed playing golf. He lived in Nairn for the last 22 years of his life.

References

External links
 Independent obituary September 2003
 Telegraph obituary August 2003

 

1918 births
2003 deaths
Alumni of the University of Aberdeen
Black Watch soldiers
People educated at Nairn Academy
People from Badenoch and Strathspey
People from Nairn
Principals of the University of Aberdeen
Vice-Chancellors of the University of Leicester